Mulakuddu is a census town in Bheemunipatnam mandal of Vishakhapanam district in the Indian state of Andhra Pradesh. It lies 37 km towards the north of Visakhapatnam. The total population of Mulakuddu is 4513 according to the 2011 Census of India. Among them males are 2255 and females are 2258

References 

Cities and towns in Anakapalli district